Melbourne Zoo is a zoo in Melbourne, Australia. It is the primary zoo serving Melbourne. As of 2021 the zoo contains 3742 animals comprising 243 species, from Australia and around the world. The zoo is accessible via Royal Park station on the Upfield railway line, and is also accessible via tram routes 58 and 19, as well as by bicycle on the Capital City Trail. Bicycles are not allowed inside the zoo itself.

The Royal Melbourne Zoological Gardens is a full institutional member of the Zoo and Aquarium Association and the World Association of Zoos and Aquariums.

The zoo is set among flower gardens and picnic areas. Many of the animals are now organised in bioclimatic zones: African rainforest ('Gorilla Rainforest') that include gorillas and lemurs; Asian rainforest ('Trail of the 'Elephants') that includes elephants, orangutans, tigers and otters; and the Australian bush with kangaroos, koalas, wombats, goannas, native birds and many others. Popular exhibits also include the 'Butterfly House', the 'Reptile House', the 'Great Flight Aviary', 'Wild Sea', 'Treetop Apes and Monkeys' and 'Lion Gorge'.

The zoo includes a large schools section and caters to many school visitors annually, its immensely popular education program encourages young minds to conserve animals.

Visitors can see historical cages including the heritage listed Elephant House, which has been renovated and adapted for use for customers paying to sleep overnight in tents at the zoo in popular Roar and Snore evenings. These evenings allow the public to see some of the nocturnal animals at the zoo in evening guided tours by experienced camp hosts.

History
In October 1857 the Zoological Society of Victoria was formed with the aim of introducing animals and plants from overseas. Its first collections of animals were housed in Richmond Paddock. In 1861 the organisation changed its name to the "Acclimatisation Society of Victoria".

Melbourne Zoo was modelled on London Zoo.

Initially the zoo was important for the acclimatisation of domestic animals recovering from their long trip to Australia. It was only with the appointment of Albert Alexander Cochrane Le Souef in 1870 that more exotic animals were procured for public display, and the gardens and picnic areas were developed. 1870 also saw the Society change its name to the "Zoological and Acclimatisation Society of Victoria", and was granted the prefix "Royal" in 1910.

One of the most famous exhibits from the early 1900s to the 1940s was Queenie the elephant.

In the mid-1930s, the Society had financial troubles. In response the Zoological Gardens Act 1936 was passed, handing the Zoo to a newly appointed Zoological Board of Victoria on behalf of the state government in 1937.

In 1964 the acclaimed Lion Park exhibit opened, with an elevated walkway overlooking and separating two exhibits. It was demolished and replaced by a new lion exhibit in 2014.

Australia's first gorilla birth occurred at Melbourne Zoo in 1984. Giant pandas were loaned to the zoo from China for an exhibition to celebrate Australia's bicentennial in 1988.

In 1989, a 35-year-old man died when he was partially eaten by a lion after he entered its pen.

The Trail of the Elephants exhibit was unveiled in 2003 and won numerous awards. On 15 January 2010 Melbourne Zoo welcomed its first elephant calf, Mali. This is the second elephant calf born in Australia, the first being in Sydney in July 2009. Mali is the first female calf born in Australia and the first calf born via artificial insemination.

Melbourne Zoo commemorated 150 years of operation in 2012 and this was celebrated in an Australian Zoos collector's edition of stamps released by Australia Post in September 2012.

The Zoo completed construction and opened a new carnivores trail in early 2018.

Zoos Victoria

The three zoos have been collectively trading as Zoos Victoria since 1973, governed by the Zoological Parks and Gardens Board, which operates under the Zoological Parks and Gardens Act 1995.

In October 2022 Kyabram Fauna Park also became part of Zoos Victoria.

Exhibits

Gorilla Rainforest
Black-and-white ruffed lemur
Black-handed spider monkey
Cotton-top tamarin
Eastern black-and-white colobus
Emperor tamarin
Northern white-cheeked gibbon
Pygmy hippopotamus
Ring-tailed lemur
Southern cassowary
Western lowland gorilla

Growing Wild
Aldabra giant tortoise
Blue-and-yellow macaw
Meerkat
Red-fronted macaw

Trail of the Elephants 
Asian elephant
Asian small-clawed otter
Bolivian squirrel monkey
Siamang
Sumatran orangutan
Sumatran tiger

Wild Sea
Australian fur seal
Little penguin
Long-nosed fur seal

Australian Bush
Budgerigar
Emu
Gouldian finch
Koala
Lace monitor
Rainbow lorikeet
Southern hairy-nosed wombat
Tasmanian devil
Western grey kangaroo
White-browed woodswallow

Great Flight Aviary

Black-faced cormorant
Black-necked stork
Black swan
Blue-faced honeyeater
Buff-banded rail
Bush stone curlew
Cattle egret
Eclectus parrot
Freckled duck
Glossy ibis
Pacific emerald dove
Pied heron
Radjah shelduck
Red-collared lorikeet
Red-tailed black cockatoo
Satin bowerbird
White-faced heron
Wonga pigeon

Lion Gorge
African lion
Brown-nosed coati
Dingo
Snow leopard
Sumatran tiger
Tasmanian devil

DigestED
Blood python
Reticulated python

World of Frogs
Australian green tree frog
Baw Baw frog
Crucifix toad
Dainty green tree frog
Eastern dwarf tree frog
Southern corroboree frog
Spotted tree frog
Stuttering frog
White-lipped tree frog

Reptile House

Coastal taipan
Corn snake
Double crested basilisk
Dumeril's boa
Eastern box turtle
Eastern diamondback rattlesnake
Elongated tortoise
Eyelash viper
Fiji crested iguana
Freshwater crocodile
Frilled lizard
Gila monster
Golden coin turtle
Lined earless dragon
Madagascar giant day gecko
Mertens' water monitor
Mexican cantil
Monocled cobra
Philippine crocodile
Philippine sailfin lizard
Pilbara rock monitor
Pink-tongued skink
Pueblan milk snake
Rainbow boa
Rhinoceros iguana
Russian tortoise
Shingleback lizard
Spiny terrapin
Tiger snake
Twist-necked turtle

Main Trail
Collared peccary
Giraffe
Hamadryas baboon
Malayan tapir
Plains zebra
Platypus
Red panda

Gallery

Notes

External links

List of species at Melbourne Zoo, globalspecies.org

1862 establishments in Australia
Zoos established in 1862
Organisations based in Melbourne
Tourist attractions in Melbourne
Zoos in Victoria (Australia)
Culture of Melbourne
Parks in Melbourne
Buildings and structures in the City of Melbourne (LGA)